Yangzhuang may refer to the following locations in China:

Subway station
 Yang Zhuang station, a station on Line 6, Beijing Subway.

Towns
 Yangzhuang, Tengzhou (羊庄镇), in Tengzhou, Shandong
Written as "杨庄镇":
 Yangzhuang, Sanhe, Hebei
 Yangzhuang, Baofeng County, in Baofeng County, Henan
 Yangzhuang, Laiwu, in Laicheng District, Laiwu, Shandong
 Yangzhuang, Yishui County, in Yishui County, Shandong

Townships
 Yangzhuang Township, Wuyishan (洋庄乡), in Wuyishan City, Fujian
Written as "杨庄乡":
 Yangzhuang Township, Suzhou, Anhui, in Yongqiao District, Suzhou, Anhui
 Yangzhuang Township, Baoding, in Nanshi District, Baoding, Hebei
 Yangzhuang Township, Wugang, Henan, in Wugang, Henan
 Yangzhuang Township, Xiping County, in Xiping County, Henan
 Yangzhuang Township, Xi'an, in Chang'an District, Xi'an, Shaanxi
 Yangzhuang Township, Wucheng County, in Wucheng County, Shandong